Phenylphosphine is an organophosphorus compound with the chemical formula C6H5PH2. It is the phosphorus analog of aniline. Like other primary phosphines, phenylphosphine has an intense penetrating odor and is highly oxidizable. It is mainly used as a precursor to other organophosphorus compounds. It can function as a ligand in coordination chemistry.

Synthesis
Phenylphosphine can be produced by reducing dichlorophenylphosphine with lithium aluminum hydride in ether:
LiAlH4 + 2C6H5PCl2 → 2C6H5PH2 + Li+ + Al3+ + 4Cl−
This reaction is performed under a nitrogen atmosphere to prevent side reactions involving oxygen.

Reactions
Oxidation of phenylphosphine with air affords the oxide.
C6H5PH2 + O2 → C6H5P(OH)2

Bis(2-cyanoethylphenyl)phosphine, which is of interest as a synthetic intermediate, can be made from phenylphosphine by base-catalyzed allylic addition to acrylonitrile.
C6H5PH2 + 2CH2=CHCN → C6H5P(CH2CH2CN)2
Bis(2-cyanoethylphenyl)phosphine is a useful precursor to 1-phenyl-4-phosphorinanone by base-induced cyclization followed by hydrolysis. Phosphorinanones can be used to prepare alkenes, amines, indoles, and secondary and tertiary alcohols by reduction, Grignard, and Reformatsky reagents.

Phenylphosphine reacts with many metal complexes to give complexes and clusters. It is the precursor to the bridging phosphinidene ligand in certain clusters.

2 (C6H5)2MCl + C6H5PH2 + 3 (C2H5)3N → ((C6H5)2M)2PC6H5 + 3 (C2H5)3N•HCl

Phenylphosphine also have uses in polymer synthesis. Using radical initiations or UV irradiation, polyaddition of phenylphosphine to 1,4-divinylbenzene or 1,4-diisopropenylbenzene will form phosphorus-containing polymers, which have self-extinguishing properties. When mixed with flammable polymers such as polystyrene and polyethylene, the mixed polymer exhibits flame resistant properties.

References

Phosphines
Foul-smelling chemicals